Julian Dennison (born 26 October 2002) is a New Zealand actor. He debuted in the 2013 film Shopping, for which he won the English Film and Television Award for Best Supporting Actor. He is known for his roles as Ricky Baker in Hunt for the Wilderpeople (2016), the highest-grossing New Zealand film in history, as Russell "Firefist" Collins in Deadpool 2 (2018), and as Belsnickel in The Christmas Chronicles 2. In 2021, Dennison starred as Josh Valentine in Godzilla vs. Kong.

Life and career
Dennison was born and raised in Lower Hutt, New Zealand. He is the third of a family of four children, and has a twin brother named Christian. Julian is of Māori descent and is a member of the Ngāti Hauā iwi (tribe), part of the  Tainui tribal  confederation. He attended Naenae Primary School, where he first auditioned, and got his first part in the film Shopping (2013). He was then cast in the Australian film Paper Planes (2015). He later attended Hutt International Boys' School in Upper Hutt.

Dennison continued with acting and was given a role in an advertisement for the NZ Transport Agency to discourage driving under the influence of drugs. The public service announcement, which became an internet sensation in New Zealand and Australia, was directed by Taika Waititi, who later asked Dennison to star in his film Hunt for the Wilderpeople (2016) without the need to audition. The film went on to become New Zealand's highest-grossing film to date, and was critically acclaimed.

Dennison played Russell Collins / Firefist in the 2018 film Deadpool 2. He was cast because of his Wilderpeople performance, and the friendship of Waititi with Deadpools filmmakers. In 2020, Dennison co-starred in The Christmas Chronicles 2, portraying Belsnickel and also voicing his elf form, and in 2021, he had a large supporting role in the monster sequel Godzilla vs. Kong.

Filmography

Film

Television

References

External links
 

Julian Dennison at NZ on Screen

2002 births
New Zealand male film actors
New Zealand male child actors
New Zealand male Māori actors
Ngāti Hauā people
Living people
People from Lower Hutt